Metasia gnorisma is a moth in the family Crambidae. It was described by John Frederick Gates Clarke in 1971. It is found in French Polynesia, where it has been recorded from Rapa Iti.

References

Moths described in 1971
Metasia